Çaltı is a village in the Söğüt District, Bilecik Province, Turkey. Its population is 1,074 (2021). It is a few kilometers south of Sakarya River. The settlement was founded by Yörüks (Nomadic Turkmens). The name of the town refers to a scrubby hill at the east of the town. The settlement was declared a town (belde) in 1972. At the 2013 reorganisation, it became a village again.

References

Villages in Söğüt District